Anna Konstantinovna Vinogradova (born 6 April 1991) is a Russian ice hockey goaltender.

International career
Vinogradova was selected for the Russia women's national ice hockey team in the 2014 Winter Olympics. She did not dress for any of the games.

Vinogradova made one appearance for the Russia women's national under-18 ice hockey team, at the IIHF World Women's U18 Championships, in 2008.

Career statistics

International career
Through 2013–14 season

References

External links
Eurohockey.com Profile

1991 births
Living people
Russian women's ice hockey goaltenders
Ice hockey players at the 2014 Winter Olympics
Olympic ice hockey players of Russia
Sportspeople from Chelyabinsk